Ireland Brook is a tributary of Lawrence Brook in Middlesex County, New Jersey in the United States.

Ireland Brook is a moderately long stream that drains an area in central East Brunswick.

Course
It crosses Fern Road, then runs through the East Brunswick Community Park and the Ireland Brook County Park. Crossing Dunhams Corner Road and the New Jersey Turnpike, it continues running through the long Ireland Brook County Park.

Accessibility
This stream runs through a park, where it is easily accessible for about half of its distance. It also crosses many roads.

Sister tributaries

Beaverdam Brook
Great Ditch
Oakeys Brook
Sawmill Brook
Sucker Brook
Terhune Run
Unnamed Brook in Rutgers Gardens, unofficially named Doc Brook
Unnamed Brook in Rutgers' Helyar Woods

See also
List of rivers of New Jersey

References

External links
USGS Coordinates in Google Maps

Rivers of Middlesex County, New Jersey
Tributaries of the Raritan River
Rivers of New Jersey